Turkey Swamp Park is a  park located in Freehold Township, New Jersey on the northern fringes of the Pine Barrens. The Turkey Swamp area is located on a ridge within the geographic heartland of New Jersey. The region includes the headwaters of the extensive Manasquan, Metedeconk, and Toms River systems to the east, the Millstone River system to the north, and the Assunpink, Crosswicks, and Manalapan Brook systems to the west. The chief recreational attraction of this park is the  lake suitable for bass, bluegill and catfish fishing, as well as canoeing and paddle boating.

History

The core of the park was purchased in 1963. Additional land was purchased in the 1970s.  In May 1993, the Park System acquired  Camp Nomoco including a  campground from the Monmouth Council of Girl Scouts to add it to Turkey Swamp Park. The Council had operated the  camp since 1947. The Council trustees were determined to sell the camp, as a Wall Herald reporter noted, to “a buyer who cares more about nature and a pristine environment than about developing the land.” The Nomoco acquisition also helped protect the Metedeconk River watershed while converting a private camping facility into a public one.

Nomenclature
The title of the park may be considered a bit of a misnomer considering the park does not bear a swamp, nor does it act as a habitat for turkeys. Although considering that the soil is rather sandy and the water table lies slightly beneath the surface, this thus gives rise to swampy conditions at times when the surface topography dips to the water line; hence the 'swamp' title. The 'turkey' prefix, however, was adapted from the town's previous name, Turkey. The town once known as Turkey is now known as the unincorporated area of Adelphia.

Park information
The park features  of trails, an archery range, an array of playgrounds, two soccer fields, and various picnic grounds. During the appropriate season, canoes, paddleboats, kayaks, and rowboats may be rented. During the winter season, if the lake freezes sufficiently, ice-skating is available for park visitors.  A significant section of the park is dedicated as a seasonal campground, complete with laundry facilities, hot-water bathrooms, and RV electric & water hook-ups. It consists of 64 pull-through campsites that can accommodate both tent campers and travel trailers.  Two wood "forest view" cabins are also available.

Nomoco Activity Area
A more secluded area in the park, called the Nomoco Activity Area, is also available for use by groups interested in group activities.  It consists of six sites each capable of accommodating groups of up to 40 people. One of the sites, called "the Outpost" is more secluded yet, requiring a hike through the woods of 1/4  mile to reach.  This area is good for groups seeking wilderness camping. In the Outpost, drinking water, for example, must be carried in, although ground water from hand pump-driven wells are available in the general area.
Also, a pit toilet is available as there are no other relief facilities at the Outpost.

Flora
The flora of Turkey Swamp Park includes pitch pine, scrub oak, white oak, sweet gum, pepperbush, huckleberry, blueberry, etc.

Trails
The orange-blazed trail, a  trail circumventing the lake.
The red-blazed trail, a  trail which leads into the woodsy camping area.
The green-blazed, a  trail leading to the lakefront area and bordering the red-blazed trail.
The blue-blazed, a  trail which guides hikers to the boathouse.

References

External links
Turkey Swamp Park Trail Review
Monmouth County Park System - Turkey Swamp Park

Swamps of New Jersey
Protected areas of the Pine Barrens (New Jersey)
Monmouth County Park System
Landforms of Monmouth County, New Jersey
Freehold Township, New Jersey